Pseudolaguvia jiyaensis is a species of catfish from the Jiya stream in Arunachal Pradesh, India.

References

Catfish of Asia
Fish of India
Taxa named by Lakpa Tamang
Taxa named by Bikramjit Sinha
Fish described in 2014
Erethistidae